Henderson Field is the name of several airports:

 Henderson Field (Guadalcanal), a former military airfield on Guadalcanal Island in the Solomon Islands
 Henderson Field (Midway) (originally Naval Air Station Midway Islands), a former World War II airfield on East Midway Island
 Henderson Field (Midway Atoll) on Sand Island in Midway Atoll, an unincorporated territory of the United States.
 Henderson Field (North Carolina) in Wallace, North Carolina, United States.